Irving Gifford Fine (December 3, 1914 – August 23, 1962) was an American composer. Fine's work assimilated neoclassical, romantic, and serial elements.  Composer Virgil Thomson described Fine's "unusual melodic grace" while Aaron Copland noted the "elegance, style, finish and...convincing continuity" of Fine's music.

Fine was a member of a close-knit group of Boston composers in the mid-20th century who were sometimes called the "Boston School." Other members of the Boston School included Arthur Berger, Leonard Bernstein, Aaron Copland, Lukas Foss, and Harold Shapero.

Life

Fine was born in Boston, Massachusetts, where he studied piano, and received both bachelor's and master's degrees from Harvard University, where he was a pupil of Walter Piston. Fine was a conducting pupil of Serge Koussevitzky, served as pianist for the Boston Symphony Orchestra, and studied composition with Nadia Boulanger at the Fontainebleau School of Music in Paris and at Radcliffe College. From 1939 until 1950, he taught music theory at Harvard and conducted its Glee Club, becoming a close associate of Leonard Bernstein, Igor Stravinsky and Aaron Copland. From 1950, he taught at Brandeis University, where he was Walter S. Naumburg Professor of Music and founded the School of Creative Arts.  Between 1946 and 1957, he also taught composition at the Tanglewood Music Festival in the Berkshires.

Irving Fine died in Natick, Massachusetts in August 1962. He was 47 years of age. The cause of death was heart disease.

Educational legacy
Notable composition students of Irving Fine include Gustav Ciamaga, Noël Lee, Ann Loomis Silsbee, Halim El-Dabh, and Richard Wernick. Towards the end of his life, Fine notably collaborated with Wernick on the musical Maggie, a work based on the Stephen Crane novel of the same name. A Professorship of Music at Brandeis University is named in Fine's honor.  The composer Arthur Berger served as Irving G. Fine Professor of Music from 1969 to 1980 (and as Emeritus Professor until his death in 2003). The current Irving G. Fine Professor of Music is Eric Chasalow.

Brandeis University is also home to the Irving Fine Society, founded in 2006 by music director Nicholas Alexander Brown. The society comprises the Irving Fine Singers and the Gifford 5, a woodwind quintet. The society "acts as a producing organization for concerts, educational programs and scholarly activities related to the legacy of composer Irving Gifford Fine and the global impact of American culture in the twentieth century."

Works

Orchestra
 Toccata concertante, 1947
 Serious Song: A Lament, strings, 1955
 Blue Towers, 1959
 Diversions, 1959–60
 Symphony, 1962

Chorus
 Three Choruses from Alice in Wonderland, 3–4 voices, piano, 1942; arrangement with orchestra, 1949
 The Choral New Yorker, S, A, Bar, 3–4 voices, piano, 1944
 A Short Alleluia, SSA, 1945
 In gratio jubilo, hymn, small orchestra, 1949
 The Hour-Glass (B. Jonson), song cycle, SATB, 1949
 Old American Songs (trad.), 2–4 voices, piano, 1952
 An Old Song (Yehoash, trans. M. Syrkin), SATB, 1953
 Three Choruses from Alice in Wonderland (L. Carroll), 2nd ser., SSA, piano, 1953
 McCord's Menagerie (McCord), TTB, 1957

Songs
 Mutability (I. Orgel), cycle, Mez, piano, 1952
 Childhood Fables for Grown-ups (G. Norman), Mez/Bar, piano/orchestra, 1954–5

Chamber and solo instrument
 Sonata, violin, piano, 1946
 Music for Piano, 1947
 Partita, wind quintet, 1948
 Notturno, strings, harp, 1950–51
 String Quartet, 1952
 Children's Piano Pieces, 1956
 Fantasia, string trio, 1956
 Hommage à Mozart, piano, 1956
 Romanza, wind quintet, 1958

Reading

A biography, Irving Fine: An American Composer in His Time, by author, composer, and pianist Phillip Ramey, was published in 2005 by the Library of Congress and Pendragon Press, and received the 2006 Nicolas Slonimsky Award for Outstanding Musical Biography from ASCAP.

References 
 Anderson, E. Ruth. Contemporary American Composers. A Biographical Dictionary, 2nd edition. G. K. Hall, 1982.
 Butterworth, Neil. A Dictionary of American Composers. Garland, 1984.
 Pollack, Howard Joel. Harvard Composers: Walter Piston and His Students, from Elliott Carter to Frederic Rzewski. Scarecrow Press, 1992.
 Press, Jaques Cattell (Ed.). ASCAP Biographical Dictionary of Composers, Authors and Publishers, 4th edition. R. R. Bowker, 1980.
 Sadie, Stanley; Hitchcock, H. Wiley (Ed.). The New Grove Dictionary of American Music. Grove's Dictionaries of Music, 1986.
 Villamil, Victoria Etnier; Hampson, Thomas. A Singer's Guide to the American Art Song 1870–1980, foreword by Thomas Hampson. Scarecrow Press, 1993.

External links
 The Irving Fine Collection at the Library of Congress
Irving Fine Collection at the Library of Congress
 Boosey & Hawkes biography
 Composer Irving Fine is Subject of New Publication
"A Fine Centennial" by Ethan Iverson

1914 births
1962 deaths
20th-century classical composers
20th-century American composers
Twelve-tone and serial composers
American classical composers
American male classical composers
Jewish American classical composers
Brandeis University faculty
Harvard University alumni
Musicians from Boston
Pupils of Walter Piston
20th-century American male musicians
Nonesuch Records artists